SMAA may refer to:

 The Stieglitz Museum of Applied Arts
 Enhanced Subpixel Morphological Antialiasing, a computer graphics antialiasing technique
 Stochastic multicriteria acceptability analysis, a multiple criteria decision aiding method
 Switchmen's Mutual Aid Association, an American trade union, 1886-1894